Renan dos Santos (born 18 May 1989), known simply as Renan, is a Brazilian footballer who plays as a goalkeeper for Brazilian club Sport.

Career

Early career
Born in Rio de Janeiro, Renan started playing football as part of CFZ do Rio's youth squad. He joined Botafogo's youth squad in 2007.

Botafogo
Renan played 22 Série A games in 2008, debuting on 11 May against Sport Recife at Engenhão. Renan started the 2009 season replacing the then Botafogo's first team goalkeeper Castillo after a knee injury that left the Uruguayan goalkeeper out of the fields for approximately six months. He played six Série A matches in 2009.

Avaí
In 2016, Renan joined Avaí. He played in all 38 matches during 2016 Campeonato Brasileiro Série B.

Ludogorets Razgrad
On 7 January 2017, Renan signed with Bulgarian club Ludogorets Razgrad. He quickly established himself as the first choice goalkeeper. In 2019, he lost even more quickly his first choice position after the arrival of Plamen Iliev, eventually falling further down the pecking order after Vladislav Stoyanov's recovery from a serious injury.

On 18 June 2021, it was announced that Renan's contract had been terminated by mutual agreement and he was released from the club.

Statistics

Club statistics
As of 13 September 2020

Personal life
On 8 May 2018 Renan received a Bulgarian passport.

Honours
Botafogo
Campeonato Carioca (2): 2010, 2013
Campeonato Brasileiro Série B: 2015

Ludogorets
 Bulgarian First League (4): 2016–17, 2017–18, 2018–19, 2019–20
 Bulgarian Supercup (2): 2018, 2019

Atlético Goianiense
Campeonato Goiano: 2022

References

External links
ogol.com.br 

1989 births
Living people
Brazilian footballers
Footballers from Rio de Janeiro (city)
Botafogo de Futebol e Regatas players
Avaí FC players
Atlético Clube Goianiense players
Sport Club do Recife players
PFC Ludogorets Razgrad players
Campeonato Brasileiro Série A players
Campeonato Brasileiro Série B players
First Professional Football League (Bulgaria) players
Association football goalkeepers
Brazilian expatriate footballers
Expatriate footballers in Bulgaria